Chris Munce (born 17 May 1969) is a highly successful Thoroughbred horse racing jockey, having won both the Melbourne Cup and the Cox Plate.

He is now a highly successful trainer of horses in Brisbane Queensland heading up a family based operation which is most notable for promoting the joy and love of the thoroughbred.

Overview 

Originally a Queensland jockey, Munce shared stable jockey duties with Danny Beasley for Gai Waterhouse Racing. During his career Chris Munce has won thirty-five Group One conditions races including some of Australia's most prestigious races:

 Brisbane Cup: Desert Chill (1995) 
 Cox Plate: Savabeel (2004)
 Melbourne Cup: Jezabeel (1998)

References 
 5 July 2006 article in The Guardian titled Top Australian jockey in bribery investigation
 1 March 2007 Sydney Morning Herald article titled Jockey jailed over betting scandal
 3 March 2007 Daily Telegraph article Why Hong Kong never a safe bet

1969 births
Living people
Australian jockeys
Australian male criminals
People convicted of bribery